Kutak-e Mohammad Karim (also Romanized as  Kūtak-e Moḩammad Karīm; also known as Kūtak-e Bālā and Kūtak-e ‘Olyā) is a village in Dodangeh Rural District, in the Central District of Behbahan County, Khuzestan Province, Iran. At the 2006 census, its population was 104, in 22 families.

References 

Populated places in Behbahan County